The 2019 Nigerian House of Representatives elections in Cross River State was held on February 23, 2019, to elect members of the House of Representatives to represent Cross River State, Nigeria.

Overview

Summary

Results

Abi/Yakurr 
A total of 13 candidates registered with the Independent National Electoral Commission to contest in the election. APC candidate Alex Egbona won the election, defeating PDP John Gaul Lebo and 11 other party candidates. Egbona received 51.77% of the votes, while Lebo received 47.44%.

Akpabuyo/Bakassi/Calabar South 
A total of 11 candidates registered with the Independent National Electoral Commission to contest in the election. PDP candidate Essien Ayi won the election, defeating APC Dominic Edem and 9 other party candidates. Ayi received 56.35% of the votes, while Edem received 41.53%.

Akamkpa/Biase 
A total of 6 candidates registered with the Independent National Electoral Commission to contest in the election. PDP candidate Daniel Effiong won the election, defeating APC Mkpanam Obo-bassey Ekpo and 4 other party candidates. Effiong received 59.66% of the votes, while Ekpo received 40.03%.

Calabar Municipal/Odukpani 
A total of 7 candidates registered with the Independent National Electoral Commission to contest in the election. PDP candidate Edim Eta won the election, defeating APC Bassey Ekpenyong Akiba and 5 other party candidates. Eta received 65.51% of the votes, while Akina received 33.56%.

Ikom/Boki 
A total of 12 candidates registered with the Independent National Electoral Commission to contest in the election. PDP candidate Ngoro Adigbe won the election, defeating APC Victor Abang and 7 other party candidates. Adigbe received 54.50% of the votes, while Abang received 42.48%.

Obanliku/Obudu/Bekwarra 
A total of 7 candidates registered with the Independent National Electoral Commission to contest in the election. PDP candidate Idagbo Ochiglegor won the election, defeating APC Koko Agaji and 5 other party candidates. Ochiglegor received 77.29% of the votes, while Agaji received 22.50%.

Obubra/Etung 
A total of 24 candidates registered with the Independent National Electoral Commission to contest in the election. PDP candidate Michael Irom Etaba won the election, defeating APC Egbe Abeng Egbe and 22 other party candidates. Etaba received 50.88% of the votes, while Egbe received 45.91%.

Ogoja/Yala 
A total of 25 candidates registered with the Independent National Electoral Commission to contest in the election. PDP candidate Agom Jarigbe won the election, defeating APC Jude Ogbeche Ngaji and 23 other party candidates. Jarigbe received 69.27% of the votes, while Ngaji received 29.88%.

References 

Cross River State House of Representatives elections
House of Representatives
Cross River